Sharmaine Arnaiz (born Sharmila Velasco Pribhdas Shahani; November 1, 1974 in Davao City, Davao del Sur, Philippines) is a Filipino actress.

Biography

She was born Sharmila Velasco Pribhdas-Shahani to an Indian father  and a mother of Hiligaynon ancestry (from Roxas, Capiz). Sharmaine has a younger sister Bunny Paras who is also an actress and they are first cousins to Patrick Garcia & Cheska Garcia through their respective mothers.

And an alumna of De La Salle Araneta University's DVM Batch 2007.

Filmography

Television

Movies

References

External links
 
 http://www.philstar.com/entertainment/800130/sharmaine-arnaiz-hopes-dreams
 http://www.pep.ph/news/45591/sharmaine-arnaiz-still-longing-to-work-with-her-idol-vilma-santos

Filipino people of Indian descent
1974 births
Living people
People from Capiz
People from Davao City
Visayan people
Actresses from Davao del Sur
Filipino television actresses
Filipino women comedians
That's Entertainment (Philippine TV series)

tl:Sharmaine Arnaiz
GMA Network personalities
ABS-CBN personalities